There have been four first ministers of a Canadian government of Asian descent. Of these, all four served premiers of a province or territory; no person of Asian descent has ever served as Prime Minister of Canada.

Asian-Canadians have been eligible to become first ministers since they gained the right to vote, beginning in 1947. The four Asian-Canadians who have held this office are Joe Ghiz and Robert Ghiz of Prince Edward Island, Ujjal Dosanjh of British Columbia, and Ranj Pillai of Yukon. Dosanjh and Pillai earned their positions through a party leadership race within their political party while it was in government, while Joe and Robert Ghiz won the title by defeating an incumbent premier in a general election. No two Asian-Canadian first ministers have ever served concurrently.

Seven Asian-Canadians have served as the leader of a political party with representation in the legislature.

First Ministers 

Four Asian-Canadians have served as first ministers, all at the provincial or territorial level.

Leaders of opposition parties

The following Asian-Canadians have served as leaders of political parties represented in the House of Commons or a provincial legislature. All eight served at the provincial level, with one going on to lead a national party. Those Asian-Canadians who served as both opposition leader and first minister at some point in their careers are listed in the above section.

See also
 List of current Canadian first ministers
 List of female first ministers in Canada
 List of Visible Minority Canadian Cabinet Ministers
 List of visible minority politicians in Canada

Footnotes

References 

Asian
First ministers